Armadillo was a 2001 three part television film starring James Frain, directed by Howard Davies and based on William Boyd's 1998 novel of the same name. Boyd also served as the screenwriter for the show.

Cast
 James Frain as Lorimer Black
 Moses Rockman as James
 Tom Hiddleston as Toby Sherrifmuir
 Catherine McCormack as Flavia Malinverno
 Stephen Rea as Hogg
 Hugh Bonneville as Torquil Helvoir Jayne
 James Fox as Sir Simon Sherrifmuir
 Neil Pearson as Rintoul

Production
The film was shot in London.

Release
The series was originally telecast as a three-part television film by BBC beginning 16 September 2001 on BBC One, it was also aired in a single, three-hour television film by American network A+E on 5 August 2002.

References

External links

2001 British television series debuts
2001 British television series endings
2000s British drama television series
BBC television dramas
2000s British television miniseries
Television shows based on British novels
English-language television shows
Television shows set in London
Films with screenplays by William Boyd (writer)